Faustin Birindwa (1943 – 29 April 1999) was a Congolese politician. A technocrat, he was an advisor to Étienne Tshisekedi and was named his Minister of Finance in October 1991, though Birindwa never took office. He became foreign minister in August 1992. After Tshisekedi was dismissed by Mobutu Sese Seko, Birindwa became Prime Minister on 18 March 1993 as a member of the pro-Mobutu Forces Politiques du Conclave. As a result, he was expelled from the  Union for Democracy and Social Progress.

As Prime Minister, Birindwa attempted to deal with the economic crisis. He announced monetary reform and instituted a new currency in September 1993, with anyone who refused to accept the currency facing imprisonment. Nonetheless, inflation by the end of the year was estimated at 9,000 percent. He attempted to hold elections but was stifled by supporters of Étienne Tshisekedi, who claimed he was the legitimate prime minister. In 1994, after a decision by the Haut Conseil de la Republique/Parlement du Transition, Birindwa stepped down as prime minister. He was succeeded by Kengo Wa Dondo, whose election in June 1994 was controversial among the opposition. Birindwa died on 29 April 1999 in Italy of a heart attack.

References

1943 births
1999 deaths
Prime Ministers of the Democratic Republic of the Congo
Finance ministers of the Democratic Republic of the Congo
Government ministers of the Democratic Republic of the Congo